Christijan Albers (born 16 April 1979) is a Dutch former professional racing driver. After success in the DTM he drove in Formula One from  until the 2007 British Grand Prix, shortly after which he was dropped by the Spyker F1 team. In 2008, he returned to the DTM series as a driver for the Audi Futurecom TME team. Albers acted as Team Principal and CEO of the Caterham F1 Team from  July to September 2014 after it was acquired by new team owners. His estimated net-worth is $50 million

Personal
Christijan was born in Eindhoven, the son of former rallycross ace and Porsche 911 Carrera campaigner André Albers, who won the 1979 Dutch International Rallycross Championship (GT Division). They are not related to their compatriot Marcel Albers, who was killed in a British Formula Three accident at Thruxton in 1992.

Albers is married to Liselore Kooijman. Their wedding took place on 11 November 2006 in Amsterdam. He resides in Monaco.

Early career
Albers began kart racing at a young age, winning the Dutch National championship in 1997. That same year, he was crowned Formula Ford 1800 champion in both Netherlands and Belgium. He also participated in the Renault Megane Marlboro Masters series. In 1998, he moved up to the German Formula Three series, winning the championship in 1999 with six wins and ten poles.

In 2000, Albers raced in the International Formula 3000 championship as team-mate to Mark Webber. He failed to score a point, but team boss Paul Stoddart later signed him again. He also raced in European Formula Racing.

DTM
Beginning in 2001, Albers raced in the Deutsche Tourenwagen Masters for Mercedes-Benz, and graduated from a privately run team to the works AMG outfit in 2003 after the departure from the series of Uwe Alzen. He was instantly a front-runner, finishing runner-up in 2003 with a season-high four wins, and challenging DTM veteran and multiple champion Bernd Schneider for the title all the way up to the final race. In 2004 he again challenged for the championship lead for the most of the season but eventually finished third.

Formula One

Minardi (2005)

While racing in the DTM, Albers continued to be a test and reserve driver for Minardi's Formula One interests, and also drove the team's two-seater Formula One cars. In November 2004, he set the fastest time at a Misano di Gera d'Adda Minardi test session. He was chosen by the team to drive in the Formula One World Championship in 2005. At the 2005 United States Grand Prix he gained his first championship points with a fifth-place finish, a race where only six drivers started.

Midland/Spyker F1 (2006–2007)

On 31 October 2005 Albers was confirmed as Midland's first official Formula One driver. Midland, the renamed Jordan team, made their debut in the 2006 Formula One season.

Albers started the 2006 season well, out-pacing Midland teammate Tiago Monteiro. However, during the first few races, Midland found themselves battling with the Super Aguri team, particularly Takuma Sato. At the 2006 San Marino Grand Prix, Albers found himself being crashed into by Yuji Ide and sent into a series of spectacular rolls. Incredibly he was unharmed. Ide was reprimanded by the race stewards. Ide also had his Super Licence revoked for severe dangerous driving.

After initial confusion over Albers's plans for 2007 after the takeover of MF1 by Spyker Cars, it was eventually confirmed that he would be driving for the Spyker F1 team in 2007.

It was later found out that Albers signed a contract with Midland F1 to remain with the team prior to the sale to Spyker. Albers's personal sponsors had major influences in Spyker buying the Midland F1 team.

In early 2007 he was outperformed by rookie team-mate Adrian Sutil. At Magny-Cours he ignored the lollipop telling him not to leave the pits during a pitstop, driving off with part of the fuel rig still attached. Albers expressed relief that nobody was hurt, but he received a €5,000 penalty for dangerous driving. Spyker technical director Mike Gascoyne commented that he was mystified by the mistake.

On 10 July 2007 he was released from his Spyker contract, due to a lack of sponsorship money, which would have compromised the team's development programme. Team owner Michiel Mol described it as "one of the toughest decisions of my career".  His replacement for the 2007 European Grand Prix was former Spyker test driver Markus Winkelhock. Sakon Yamamoto then raced for Spyker for the rest of the year.

Albers returned with the Spyker team for the Rotterdam street racing event in the Netherlands, on the 18 / 19 August.

Team principal at Caterham F1 (2014)
On 2 July 2014 Tony Fernandes sold the Caterham F1 Team to a consortium of Swiss-Middle Eastern investors. Subsequently, team principal Cyril Abiteboul stepped down and Albers was given his position in the team by the consortium. He ran the team on a day-to-day basis until Caterham collapsed following the 2014 Abu Dhabi Grand Prix.

Return to DTM

Christijan Albers returned to the DTM-series in December 2007 as the Dutchman was invited by the Audi-team of Futurecom TME for a week of testing in Jerez de la Frontera. He tested for this team again on the Mugello Circuit in early March.

Christijan Albers was confirmed as a race driver for the Futurecom TME race team for 2008. He raced alongside Katherine Legge in a 2006 Specification Audi A4 DTM.

Albers is the Netherlands's most successful driver in the DTM series, finishing as runner-up in the 2003 championship.

Sportscar racing
It was announced on 9 October 2008 that Albers would be racing with Audi Sport North America in the American Le Mans Series. He piloted the #1 R10 TDI, partnered with Emanuele Pirro at Laguna Seca, the ALMS final round. This was another step by Audi to bring youth to their Le Mans programs, following Marcel Fässler's two races in the R10. He finished this race in second place behind the #2 car from the same team.

He moved into the Le Mans Series for the 2009 season, moving to the customer Audi team, run by Colin Kolles.

Helmet design

Albers' helmet design consists of an orange helmet with multiple black dots over it. He later changed it to the same design, but with inverted colors.

Career as TV analyst 
In 2021, it was announced that Albers would be part of the permanent team of Formula One analysts for the new Dutch sports broadcaster Viaplay from 2022 onwards. At the Dutch TV channel, Albers is accompanied by other analysts such as former Formula One driver Giedo van der Garde as well as Tom Coronel and former GP2 driver and current WEC driver
Ho-Pin Tung.

Racing record

Career summary

Complete International Formula 3000 results
(key) (Races in bold indicate pole position) (Races in italics indicate fastest lap)

Complete DTM results
(key)

† — Retired, but was classified as he completed 90% of the winner's race distance.

Complete Formula One results
(key) (Races in bold indicate pole position; races in italics indicate fastest lap)

† Did not finish the race, but was classified as he had completed more than 90% of the race distance.

Complete American Le Mans Series results

24 Hours of Le Mans results

Complete Le Mans Series results

Complete FIA World Endurance Championship results

References

External links

 
 

1979 births
Living people
Sportspeople from Eindhoven
Dutch racing drivers
Dutch Formula One drivers
Formula Ford drivers
German Formula Three Championship drivers
Deutsche Tourenwagen Masters drivers
International Formula 3000 drivers
Minardi Formula One drivers
Midland Formula One drivers
Spyker Formula One drivers
24 Hours of Le Mans drivers
American Le Mans Series drivers
European Le Mans Series drivers
FIA World Endurance Championship drivers
Asian Le Mans Series drivers
HWA Team drivers
Van Amersfoort Racing drivers
Opel Team BSR drivers
Team Rosberg drivers
Kolles Racing drivers
British Formula Three Championship drivers
Mercedes-AMG Motorsport drivers
Audi Sport drivers
Formula One team principals